Cerithidium diplax is a species of sea snail, a marine gastropod mollusk in the family Cerithiidae.

Description

Distribution
This species is distributed in the Mediterranean Sea and along Queensland, Australia

References

 Streftaris, N.; Zenetos, A.; Papathanassiou, E. (2005). Globalisation in marine ecosystems: the story of non-indigenous marine species across European seas. Oceanogr. Mar. Biol. Annu. Rev. 43: 419–453
 van Aartsen J.J. (2006). Indo-Pacific migrants into the Mediterranean. 4. Cerithidium diplax (Watson, 1886) and Cerithidium perparvulum (Watson, 1886) (Gastropoda, Caenogastropoda). Basteria 70: 33–39

External links

Cerithiidae
Gastropods described in 1886